Latak (also Romanized as Lātak) is a village in Shabkhus Lat Rural District, Rankuh District, Amlash County, Gilan Province, Iran. At the 2006 census, its population was 96 people in 27 families.

References 

Populated places in Amlash County